The Anglo–Dutch Wars were a series of conflicts mainly fought between the Dutch Republic and England (later Great Britain) from mid-17th to late 18th century. The first three wars occurred in the second half of the 17th century over trade and overseas colonies, while the fourth was fought a century later. Almost all the battles were naval engagements.

The English were successful in the first, while the Dutch were successful in the second and third clashes. However, by the time of the fourth war, the British Royal Navy had become the most powerful maritime force in the world.

There would be more battles in the late 18th and early 19th centuries, mainly won by the British, but these are generally considered to be separate conflicts.

Background 
The English and the Dutch were both participants in the 16th-century European religious conflicts between the Catholic Habsburg Dynasty and the opposing Protestant states. At the same time, as the Age of Exploration dawned, the Dutch and English both sought profits overseas in the New World.

Dutch Republic 
In the early 1600s, the Dutch, while continuing to fight the Eighty Years' War with the Catholic Habsburgs, also began to carry out long-distance exploration by sea. The Dutch innovation in the trading of shares in a joint-stock company allowed them to finance expeditions with stock subscriptions sold in the United Provinces and in London. They founded colonies in North America, India, and Indonesia (the Spice Islands). They also enjoyed continued success in privateering – in 1628 Admiral Piet Heyn became the only commander to successfully capture a large Spanish treasure fleet. With the many long voyages by Dutch East India men, their society built an officer class and institutional knowledge that would later be replicated in England, principally by the East India Company.

By the middle of the 17th century, the Dutch joined the Portuguese as the main European traders in Asia. This coincided with the enormous growth of the Dutch merchant fleet, made possible by the cheap mass production of the fluyt sailing ship types. Soon the Dutch had one of Europe's largest mercantile fleets, with more merchant ships than all other nations combined, and possessed a dominant position in the Baltic trade.

In 1648 the United Provinces concluded the Peace of Münster with Spain. Due to the division of powers in the Dutch Republic, the army and navy were the main base of power of the Stadtholder, although the budget allocated to them was set by the States General. With the arrival of peace, the States General decided to decommission most of the Dutch military. This led to conflict between the major Dutch cities and the new Stadtholder, William II of Orange, bringing the Republic to the brink of civil war. The Stadtholder's unexpected death in 1650 only added to the political tensions.

England

Tudor 
In the 16th century Elizabeth I of England built up her navy in order to carry out long-range "privateering" or piracy missions against the Spanish Empire's global interests, exemplified by the attacks by Francis Drake on Spanish merchant shipping and its harbours. Partly to provide a pretext for ongoing hostilities against Spain, Elizabeth assisted the Dutch Revolt (1581) against the Kingdom of Spain by signing the Treaty of Nonsuch in 1585 with the new Dutch state of the United Provinces.

Stuart 
After the death of Elizabeth, Anglo-Spanish relations began to improve under James the First, and the peace of 1604 ended most privateering actions (until the outbreak of the next Anglo-Spanish War during the Thirty Years' War). Underfunding then led to neglect of the Royal Navy.

Later, Catholic sympathiser Charles I of England made a number of secret agreements with Spain, directed against Dutch sea power. But fearful of endangering his relations with the powerful Dutch stadtholder Frederick Henry, Prince of Orange, his assistance to Spain was limited in practice to allowing Habsburg troops on their way to Dunkirk to make use of English shipping. However, in 1639, when a large Spanish transport fleet sought refuge in the English Downs anchorage off the town of Deal in Kent, Charles chose not to protect it against a Dutch attack; the resulting Battle of the Downs undermined both Spanish sea power and Charles's reputation in Spain.

Meanwhile, in the New World, naval forces from the Dutch New Netherlands and the English Massachusetts Bay Colony contested much of America's north-eastern seaboard.

Cromwell 
The outbreak of the English Civil War in 1642 began a period in which England's naval position was severely weakened. Its navy was internally divided, though its officers tended to favour the parliamentary side; after the execution by public beheading of King Charles in 1649, however, Oliver Cromwell was able to unite his country into the Commonwealth of England. He then revamped the navy by expanding the number of ships, promoting officers on merit rather than family connections, and cracking down on embezzlement by suppliers and dockyard staff, thereby positioning England to mount a global challenge to Dutch trade dominance.

The mood in England grew increasingly belligerent towards the Dutch. This partly stemmed from old perceived slights: the Dutch were considered to have shown themselves ungrateful for the aid they had received against the Spanish by growing stronger than their former English protectors; they caught most of the herring off the English east coast; they had driven the English out of the East Indies; and they vociferously appealed to the principle of free trade to circumvent taxation in the English colonies. There were also new points of conflict: with the decline of Spanish power at the end of the Thirty Years' War in 1648, the colonial possessions of the Portuguese Empire (already in the midst of Portuguese Restoration War) and perhaps even those of the Spanish Empire itself were up for grabs.

Cromwell feared the influence of both the Orangist faction at home and English royalists exiled to the Republic; the Stadtholders had supported the Stuart monarchs—William II of Orange had married the daughter of Charles I of England in 1641—and they abhorred the trial and execution of Charles I.

Early in 1651 Cromwell tried to ease tensions by sending a delegation to The Hague proposing that the Dutch Republic join the Commonwealth and assist the English in conquering most of Spanish America for its extremely valuable resources. This thinly-veiled attempt to end Dutch sovereignty by drawing it into a lopsided alliance with England in fact led to war: the ruling peace faction in the States of Holland was unable to formulate an answer to this unexpected offer and the pro-Stuart Orangists incited mobs to harass Cromwell's envoys. When the delegation returned home, the English Parliament decided to pursue a policy of confrontation.

Wars

First war: 1652–1654 

As a result of Cromwell's ambitious programme of naval expansion, at a time when the Dutch admiralty was selling off many of its own warships, the British came to possess a greater number of larger and more powerful purpose-built warships than did their rivals across the North Sea. However, the Dutch had many more cargo ships, together with lower freight rates, better financing and a wider range of manufactured goods to sell – although Dutch ships were blocked by the Spanish from operations in most of southern Europe, giving the English an advantage there.

To protect its position in North America, in October 1651 the English Parliament passed the first of the Navigation Acts, which mandated that all goods imported into England must be carried by English ships or vessels from the exporting countries, thus excluding (mostly Dutch) middlemen. This typical mercantilist measure as such did not hurt the Dutch much as the English trade was relatively unimportant to them, but it was used by the many pirates operating from British territory as an ideal pretext to legally take any Dutch ship they encountered.

The Dutch responded to the growing intimidation by enlisting large numbers of armed merchantmen into their navy. The English, trying to revive an ancient right they perceived they had to be recognised as the 'lords of the seas', demanded that other ships strike their flags in salute to their ships, even in foreign ports. On 29 May 1652, Lieutenant-Admiral Maarten Tromp refused to show the respectful haste expected in lowering his flag to salute an encountered English fleet. This resulted in a skirmish, the Battle of Dover, after which the Commonwealth declared war on 10 July.

After some inconclusive minor fights the English were successful in the first major battle, General at Sea Robert Blake defeating the Dutch Vice-Admiral Witte de With in the Battle of the Kentish Knock in October 1652. Believing that the war was all but over, the English divided their forces and in December were routed by the fleet of Lieutenant-Admiral Maarten Tromp at the Battle of Dungeness in the English Channel.

The Dutch were also victorious in March 1653, at the Battle of Leghorn near Italy and had gained effective control of both the Mediterranean and the English Channel. Blake, recovering from an injury, rethought, together with George Monck, the whole system of naval tactics, and after the winter of 1653 used the line of battle, first to drive the Dutch navy out of the English Channel in the Battle of Portland and then out of the North Sea in the Battle of the Gabbard. The Dutch were unable to effectively resist as the States General of the Netherlands had not in time heeded the warnings of their admirals that much larger warships were needed.

In the final Battle of Scheveningen on 10 August 1653, Tromp was killed, a blow to Dutch morale, but the English had to end their blockade of the Dutch coast. As both nations were by now exhausted and Cromwell had dissolved the warlike Rump Parliament, ongoing peace negotiations could be brought to fruition, albeit after many months of slow diplomatic exchanges.

The war ended on 5 April 1654, with the signing of the Treaty of Westminster (ratified by the States General on 8 May), but the commercial rivalry was not resolved, the English having failed to replace the Dutch as the world's dominant trade nation. The treaty contained a secret annex, the Act of Seclusion, forbidding the infant Prince William III of Orange from becoming stadtholder of the province of Holland, which would prove to be a future cause of discontent. In 1653 the Dutch had started a major naval expansion programme, building sixty larger vessels, partly closing the qualitative gap with the English fleet. Cromwell, having started the war against Spain without Dutch help, during his rule avoided a new conflict with the Republic, even though the Dutch in the same period defeated his Portuguese and Swedish allies.

Second war: 1665–1667 

After the English Restoration in 1660, Charles II tried through diplomatic means to make his nephew, Prince William III of Orange, stadtholder of the Republic. At the same time, Charles promoted a series of anti-Dutch mercantilist policies, which led to a surge of jingoism in England, the country being, as Samuel Pepys put it, "mad for war".

English merchants and chartered companies—such as the East India Company, the Royal Adventurers Trading into Africa, and the Levant Company—calculated that global economic primacy could now be wrestled from the Dutch. They reckoned that a combination of naval battles and irregular privateering missions would cripple the Dutch Republic and force the States General to agree to a favourable peace. The plan was for English ships to be replenished, and sailors paid, with booty seized from captured Dutch merchant vessels returning from overseas.

In 1665 many Dutch ships were captured, and Dutch trade and industry were hurt. The English achieved several victories in battle, such as taking the Dutch colony of New Netherland (present day New York) by Charles' brother, the future James II; but there were also Dutch victories, such as the capture of the English flagship Prince Royal during the Four Days Battle—the subject of a famous painting by Willem van de Velde.

Dutch maritime trade recovered from 1666, while the English war effort and her economy suffered when the country was ravaged by plague and much of the trading heart of the capital was burnt to the ground by the Great Fire of London (which was generally interpreted in the Dutch Republic as divine retribution for Holmes's Bonfire).

A surprise attack in June 1667, the Raid on the Medway, on the English fleet in its home port arguably won the war for the Dutch; it is considered to be one of the most humiliating defeats in British military history. A flotilla of ships led by Admiral de Ruyter sailed up the Thames Estuary, broke through the defences guarding Chatham Harbour, set fire to ships of the English fleet moored there, and towed away  and the Royal Charles, the pride of the English fleet. Also in June 1667, the Dutch sailed a vessel from New Amsterdam into what is now Hampton Roads, Virginia, destroying a British ship in the harbour and attacking its fort.

The hammerblow at Chatham had a major psychological impact throughout England. This, together with the cost of the war and the extravagant spending of Charles's court, produced a rebellious atmosphere in London. Charles ordered the English envoys at Breda to sign a peace quickly with the Dutch, as he feared an open revolt against him.

Third war: 1672–1674 

Soon the English navy was rebuilt. After the embarrassing events in the previous war, English public opinion was unenthusiastic about starting a new one. However, as he was bound by the secret Treaty of Dover, Charles II was obliged to assist Louis XIV in his attack on the Dutch Republic in the Franco-Dutch War. When the French army was halted by the Hollandic Water Line (a defence system involving strategic flooding), an attempt was made to invade The Republic by sea. De Ruyter gained four strategic victories against the Anglo-French fleet and prevented invasion.

After these failures the English parliament forced Charles to make peace.

Fourth war: 1780–1784 

The Dutch successful invasion of Britain placing William III of Orange-Nassau on the English throne as co-ruler with his wife Mary, called in British history the Glorious Revolution of 1688, ended the 17th century conflict between the Dutch Republic and Britain. This proved to be a pyrrhic victory for the Dutch cause. William's main concern had been getting the English on the same side as the Dutch in their competition against France. After becoming the British monarch, he granted many privileges to the British Royal Navy in order to ensure their loyalty and cooperation. William ordered that any Anglo-Dutch fleet be under English command, with the Dutch navy having 60% of the strength of the English.

By 1707 the formal union between the Kingdoms of England and Scotland had taken place with the new and more powerful Kingdom of Great Britain being governed by the London-based Parliament. This new British state increasingly became the dominant military and economic force. The Dutch merchant elite began to use London as a new operational base and Dutch economic growth slowed. From about 1720 Dutch wealth ceased to grow at all; around 1780 the per capita gross national product of the Kingdom of Great Britain surpassed that of the Dutch. Whereas in the 17th century the commercial success of the Dutch had inspired English jealousy and admiration, in the late 18th century the growth of British power, and the concurrent loss of Amsterdam's preeminence, led to Dutch resentment.

When the Dutch Republic began to support the Thirteen Colonies that rebelled in 1775 against the British Crown, the fourth war broke out. The war made the Dutch Republic in turn fatally vulnerable to the French and led to regime change. The Dutch navy was much weakened, having only about twenty ships of the line, so there were no large fleet battles. The British tried to reduce the Republic to the status of a British protectorate, using Prussian military pressure and gaining factual control over the Dutch colonies, with those conquered during the war given back at war's end. The Dutch then still held some key positions in the European trade with Asia, such as the Cape Colony, Ceylon and Malacca. The war had sparked a new round of Dutch ship building (95 warships in the last quarter of the 18th century), but the British kept their absolute numerical superiority by doubling their fleet during the same period.

Later wars 
In the French Revolutionary and Napoleonic Wars of 1793–1815, France reduced the Netherlands to a satellite and finally annexed the country in 1810. In 1797 the Dutch fleet was defeated by the British in the Battle of Camperdown. France considered both the extant Dutch fleet and the large Dutch shipbuilding capacity very important assets, but after the Battle of Trafalgar gave up its attempt to match the British fleet, despite a strong Dutch lobby to this effect. After the incorporation of the Netherlands in the French Empire in 1810, Britain finished seizing all the Dutch colonies. With the signing of the Anglo-Dutch Treaty of 1814, Britain returned all those colonies to the new Kingdom of the Netherlands, with the exception of the Cape, Ceylon, and part of Dutch Guyana.

Some historians count the wars between Britain and the Batavian Republic and the Kingdom of Holland during the Napoleonic era as the Fifth and Sixth Anglo-Dutch wars.

See also 
 British military history
 Dutch military history
 Netherlands–United Kingdom relations

Notes

Further reading 
 Boxer, Charles Ralph. The Anglo-Dutch Wars of the 17th Century (1974)
 Bruijn, Jaap R. The Dutch navy of the seventeenth and eighteenth centuries (U of South Carolina Press, 1993).
 Geyl, Pieter. Orange & Stuart 1641–1672 (1969)
 Hainsworth, D. R., et al. The Anglo-Dutch Naval Wars 1652–1674 (1998)
 Israel, Jonathan Ie. The Dutch Republic: its rise, greatness and fall, 1477–1806 (1995), pp. 713–726, 766–776, 796–806. The Dutch political perspective.
 Jones, James Rees. The Anglo-Dutch wars of the seventeenth century (1996) online; the fullest military history.
 Kennedy, Paul M. The rise and fall of British naval mastery (1983) pp. 47–74.
 Konstam, Angus, and Tony Bryan. Warships of the Anglo-Dutch Wars 1652–74 (2011) excerpt and text search
 Levy, Jack S., and Salvatore Ali. "From commercial competition to strategic rivalry to war: The evolution of the Anglo-Dutch rivalry, 1609–52." in The dynamics of enduring rivalries (1998) pp. 29–63.
 Messenger, Charles, ed. Reader's Guide to Military History (Routledge, 2013). pp. 19–21.
 Ogg, David. England in the Reign of Charles II (2nd ed. 1936), pp. 283–321 (Second War); pp. 357–388. (Third War), Military emphasis.
 Palmer, M. A. J. "The 'Military Revolution' Afloat: The Era of the Anglo-Dutch Wars and the Transition to Modern Warfare at Sea." War in history 4.2 (1997): pp. 123–149.
 Padfeld, Peter. Tides of Empire: Decisive Naval Campaigns in the Rise of the West. Vol. 2 1654–1763. (1982).
 Pincus, Steven C.A. Protestantism and Patriotism: Ideologies and the making of English foreign policy, 1650–1668 (Cambridge UP, 2002).
 Rommelse, Gijs "Prizes and Profits: Dutch Maritime Trade during the Second Anglo-Dutch War," International Journal of Maritime History (2007) 19#2 pp. 139–159.
 Rommelse, Gijs. "The role of mercantilism in Anglo-Dutch political relations, 1650–74." Economic History Review 63#3 (2010) pp. 591–611.

External links 

 .
 National Maritime Museum, London.
 Dutch Admiral Michiel de Ruyters' flagship 'The Seven Provinces' is being rebuilt in the Dutch town of Lelystad.
 .

 
Geopolitical rivalry
Military history of the Thirteen Colonies